Skåre is a locality situated in Karlstad Municipality, Värmland County, Sweden with 5,402 inhabitants in 2010. The town grew up around the railway station which was an important transshipment point: goods transported on the Klarälven River were here transferred to rail for onward conveyance, and vice versa .

References

External links
A map of Skåre
Skåre: statistical data (in Swedish)
Skåre railway station (in Swedish)

Populated places in Värmland County
Populated places in Karlstad Municipality